Pollimyrus is a genus of elephantfishes native to Africa.

Species
There are currently 19 recognized species in this genus:

 Pollimyrus adspersus (Günther 1866)
 Pollimyrus brevis (Boulenger 1913) (Dungu mormyrid)
 Pollimyrus castelnaui (Boulenger, 1911) (Dwarf stonebasher)
 Pollimyrus cuandoensis B. J. Kramer, van der Bank & Wink 2013 (Kwando mormyrid)
Pollimyrus eburneensis Bigorne, 1991 (Agnebi elephantfish)
 Pollimyrus guttatus (Fowler 1936) (Cameroon mormyrid)
 Pollimyrus isidori (Valenciennes 1847)
 Pollimyrus isidori fasciaticeps (Boulenger 1920)
 Pollimyrus isidori isidori (Valenciennes 1847)
 Pollimyrus isidori osborni (Nichols & Griscom 1917)
 Pollimyrus maculipinnis (Nichols & La Monte 1934) (Kananga mormyrid)
 Pollimyrus marianne B. J. Kramer van der Bank, Flint, Sauer-Gürth & Wink 2003 (Lisikili mormyrid)
 Pollimyrus nigricans (Boulenger 1906) (Dark stonebasher)
 Pollimyrus nigripinnis (Boulenger, 1899) (Kutu mormyrid)
 Pollimyrus pedunculatus (L. R. David & Poll 1937) (Boma mormyrid)
 Pollimyrus petherici (Boulenger 1898) (Khartum mormyrid)
 Pollimyrus petricolus (Daget 1954) (Markala mormyrid)
 Pollimyrus plagiostoma (Boulenger 1898) (Matadi mormyrid)
 Pollimyrus pulverulentus (Boulenger 1899) (Coquilhatville mormyrid)
 Pollimyrus schreyeni Poll 1972 (Schreyen mormyrid)
 Pollimyrus stappersii (Boulenger 1915) (Stappers’ mormyrid)
 Pollimyrus stappersii kapangae (L. R. David 1935)
 Pollimyrus stappersii stappersii (Boulenger 1915)
 Pollimyrus tumifrons (Boulenger 1902) (Banzyville mormyrid)

References 

Mormyridae
Taxonomy articles created by Polbot
Ray-finned fish genera